The members of the 9th Manitoba Legislature were elected in the Manitoba general election held in January 1896. The legislature sat from February 6, 1896, to November 16, 1899.

The Liberals led by Thomas Greenway formed the government.

Rodmond Roblin served as Leader of the Opposition.

Finlay McNaughton Young served as speaker for the assembly.

There were four sessions of the 9th Legislature:

James Colebrooke Patterson was Lieutenant Governor of Manitoba.

Members of the Assembly 
The following members were elected to the assembly in 1896:

Notes:

By-elections 
By-elections were held to replace members for various reasons:

Notes:

References 

Terms of the Manitoba Legislature
1896 establishments in Manitoba
1899 disestablishments in Manitoba